CineVista Theatres was a movie theatre chain in Puerto Rico founded in 1997. As CineVista continued to close all of the theaters, it was bankrupt. After CineVista was bankrupt, Caribbean Cinemas is the only theatre chain in Puerto Rico.

History
CineVista founded in 1997 and in 1998, CineVista started opening the Mayaguez Mall and the Mayaguez Town Center locations. In 1999, it grew the company by opening few locations, the Palma Real location, the Plaza Las Americas location and the Señorial Mall location as well as the Hatillo location which is located at Plaza del Norte. In 2000, it opened the Plaza Carolina location as well as the Naranjito location, which was only opened for a year and in 2001, it was closed. Three years later, CineVista reopened the Naranjito location but in November 2004, it was owned by Naranjito Centro Cinemas. The Señorial Mall location closed down in 2003, and four years later, CineVista had financing troubles that gradually closing all of the theatres. In 2008, CineVista had two remaining locations left, the Mayaguez Mall location and the Mayaguez Town Center location. In November of the same year, CineVista closed down both locations and three months later, it was bankrupt. The Mayaguez Town Center location is now owned by El Cine. In 2012, Caribbean Cinemas owned the Plaza del Norte location five years after it was closed in 2007.

Locations
Plaza Las Americas (closed September 23, 2005, but currently available on the second floor as Caribbean Cinemas)
Plaza Carolina (closed January 18, 2008, but currently available as Caribbean Cinemas)
Mayaguez Mall (closed November 10, 2008)
Mayaguez Town Center (closed November 10, 2008, currently owned by El Cine.)
Señorial Mall (closed May 30, 2003)
Palma Real (closed September 1, 2007)
Plaza del Norte (closed April 27, 2007.  Now Caribbean Cinemas.)
Naranjito (closed in 2001, re-opened in 2004 but owned by Naranjito Centro Cinemas)

Former cinemas
Cinemas and movie theaters chains
Companies established in 1997